Tada Station (多田駅) is the name of two train stations in Japan:

 Tada Station (Hyōgo), in the city of Kawanishi, Hyōgo Prefecture
 Tada Station (Tochigi), in Sano, Tochigi